Vittana was a non-governmental organization that allowed people to lend money via the Internet to students in the developing world. It was a 501(c)(3) non-profit organization headquartered in Seattle. Vittana focused on student loans because student loans are nearly unavailable in developing countries.

The loans issued by Vittana ranged from $200 to $1,500 and were funded by individual lenders through Kiva's lending platform and Vittana's funds. Students were given cash advances for educational expenses before money from donors had been collected. The cash advance provided by a partner organization was covered when Kiva or Vittana had aggregated sufficient money from donors. A mother or a close relative acted as a co-signer. The recipient of the loan could repay the loan after landing a job. Vittana students had a 98% repayment rate.

Vittana ceased operations in 2014.

References

External links
Official website

Microfinance organizations
Non-profit organizations based in Seattle
Peer-to-peer charities
Peer-to-peer lending companies
Charities based in Washington (state)
Organizations established in 2008